Slit homolog 3 protein is a protein that in humans is encoded by the SLIT3 gene.

References

Further reading 

 
 
 
 
 
 
 
 

Slit proteins